The Fuji-Cup was a German football competition held during the summer break from 1986 to 1996 immediately prior to the kick-off the Bundesliga season. The competition featured four leading teams, playing two semi-finals and a final in a generally more provincial area of the country. Nowadays there is a similar competition named LIGA total! Cup.

The competition competed with the DFB-Supercup although ultimately the two competitions were replaced by the DFB-Ligapokal.

Winners
Casio-Cup 1986

Fuji-Cup 1987

Fuji-Cup 1988

Fuji-Cup 1989

Fuji-Cup 1990

Fuji-Cup 1991

Fuji-Cup 1992

Fuji-Cup 1993

Fuji-Cup 1994

Fuji-Cup 1995

Fuji-Cup 1996

Championships by team

References

Defunct football cup competitions in Germany
Recurring sporting events established in 1986
Recurring sporting events disestablished in 1996
1986 establishments in Germany
1996 disestablishments in Germany